Glenn Justice Chapman (January 21, 1906 – November 5, 1988) was an American Major League Baseball player. Nicknamed "Pete", he played in 67 games for the  Brooklyn Dodgers during the 1934 season.

External links

1906 births
1988 deaths
Major League Baseball outfielders
Brooklyn Dodgers players
Baseball players from Indiana
Minor league baseball managers
Sportspeople from Richmond, Indiana
Richmond Roses players
Quincy Indians players
Terre Haute Tots players
Indianapolis Indians players
Fort Worth Cats players
Albany Senators players
Montreal Royals players
Sacramento Senators players
Baltimore Orioles (IL) players
Nashville Vols players
Knoxville Smokies players
Oakland Oaks (baseball) players
St. Paul Saints (AA) players
Grand Forks Chiefs players
People from Cambridge City, Indiana